Her Venetian Name in Deserted Calcutta is a French film directed by Marguerite Duras in 1976. The film is the soundtrack to her 1975 film India Song set to different images alongside an additional ending. The film premiered at the 1976 Cannes Film Festival in Directors' Fortnight.

Duras demonstrates that the disease and suffering of the Indians symbolically infects the Europeans as well. Thus, she asserts:
One of the external signs of the fissuring of the seemingly watertight compartmentalized colonial society is the deep sense of malaise and maladjustment which is wearing out its white inhabitants. In spite of the vast paraphernalia of protective artifices, the Europeans find their presence in the colony quite intolerable.

The composer of the movie is Carlos d'Alessio.

References

External links
 

1976 films
French drama films
Films directed by Marguerite Duras
Films set in India
Films set in the British Raj
Films set in Kolkata
1970s French films